
This is a list of players who graduated from the Nike Tour in 1996. The top ten players on the Nike Tour's money list in 1996 earned their PGA Tour card for 1997.

*PGA Tour rookie for 1997.

T = Tied
Green background indicates the player retained his PGA Tour card for 1998 (won or finished inside the top 125).
Yellow background indicates player did not retain his PGA Tour card for 1998, but retained conditional status (finished between 126–150).
Red background indicates the player did not retain his PGA Tour card for 1998 (finished outside the top 150).

Winners on the PGA Tour in 1997

See also
1996 PGA Tour Qualifying School graduates

References
Money list

Korn Ferry Tour
PGA Tour
Nike Tour graduates
Nike Tour graduates